Miami is a 1924 American silent society melodrama film directed by Alan Crosland and distributed by W. W. Hodkinson. The film stars Betty Compson and Hedda Hopper.

Cast
 Betty Compson as Joan Bruce
 Lawford Davidson as Ransom Tate
 Hedda Hopper as Mary Tate
 J. Barney Sherry as David Forbes
 Lucy Fox as Veronica Forbes
 Benjamin F. Finney, Jr. as Grant North

Preservation
With no copies of Miami located in any film archives, it is a lost film.

References

External links 

 
 
 Window card (archived)
 Window card

1924 films
1924 drama films
Silent American drama films
American silent feature films
American black-and-white films
Films directed by Alan Crosland
Films set in Miami
Films shot in Miami
American independent films
Lost American films
Melodrama films
Films distributed by W. W. Hodkinson Corporation
1920s independent films
1924 lost films
Lost drama films
1920s American films
1920s English-language films